"Province" is the second single from TV on the Radio's album Return to Cookie Mountain. The song features David Bowie on backing vocals.

Track listing (7″ vinyl single)

A1. Province (written by Kyp Malone)
 
 
 
 
 
 
 

B1. Dumb Animal (written by Aku Orraca-Tetteh, David Andrew Sitek, Kyp Malone)
 
 
 

B2. Wasted Weekend (written by Smith)
 
 
 
 
 

Producer: Dave Sitek
Cover artwork by Conejo, technical artwork assistance by Dave Sitek

Music video
A music video was produced for the song "Province", released in February 2007. Shot in black and white and directed by Jeff Scheven, it features Cynthia Udriot as a female soldier lip-syncing the song's lyrics. She is repeatedly shot, whereupon characters portrayed by band members Adebimpe and Malone revive her.

References

2006 singles
TV on the Radio songs
4AD singles
2006 songs
Songs written by Dave Sitek